Sorrowburn is the debut album of the Finnish gothic metal band Charon. The style of the album is markedly different from most of Charon's music – the tentative foray into death metal territory evident on Sorrowburn was not to last, and the band soon found their sound naturally transforming into more a contemporary rock-metal style in their later albums.

Track listing 

 "Burndown" – 2:06
 "Wortex" – 4:57
 "Breeze" – 3:37
 "Serenity" – 4:34
 "To Serve You" – 3:12
 "Nightwing" – 4:08
 "Neverbirth" – 6:31
 "Kheimos" – 3:36
 "November's Eve" – 4:54
 "Morrow" – 8:33

Personnel
Juha-Pekka "JP" Leppäluoto – vocals
Pasi Sipilä – guitar
Jasse von Hast – guitar
Ant Karihtala – drums
Teemu Hautamäki – bass

Production
Charon – cover design and art
J. Matinheikki – recording, mixing, production

1998 debut albums
Charon (band) albums